Simply Red 25: The Greatest Hits is a 2008 album, released by Simply Red, as both a standard and deluxe edition which contained material from their 25-year career. In the US it was released in 1CD format. In Europe it was released in a 2CD format, as well as a 2CD and DVD deluxe edition. The single "Go Now", a cover of Bessie Banks, was released from the album, but failed to chart. The album itself was a moderate success, peaking at #9 on the UK Albums Chart. On 9 October 2010 the album returned to the UK Top Ten, again peaking at #9.

Track listing

2CD Europe version

1CD US version

Charts

Weekly charts

Year-end charts

Certifications and sales

}

References

Simply Red albums
2008 greatest hits albums
2008 video albums
Music video compilation albums
Universal Music Group compilation albums